Hermanus Koekkoek, sometimes referred to as The Elder (13 March 1815, Middelburg - 5 November 1882, Haarlem) was a Dutch painter, etcher, and graphic artist. He specialized in marine art.

Life and work 

He was a member of the famous ; the son of Johannes Hermanus Koekkoek, and brother of the landscape painters, Barend Cornelis,  and Marinus Adrianus. He also had three daughters.

His father specialized in marine art, and gave Hermanus his first art lessons. In 1826, his family moved to Durgerdam, near Amsterdam. Later, he went to Amsterdam, took classes at the Rijksakademie, and established himself as a free-lance artist. Like his father, he focused on marine art, although he also created numerous landscapes. His style was a combination of Realism, and the newer Romantic aesthetic. Influences from the artists of the Dutch Golden Age are clearly visible, as well.

He provided his four sons with their first painting lessons, as well as schooling his contemporary, the etcher , in the techniques peculiar to marine painting. He won a gold medal at one of their exhibitions in 1875. Many of his works were sold in Germany and England.

In 1882 he moved to Haarlem. He died there that same year, aged sixty-seven. His works may be seen at the Teylers Museum, and the Museum Boijmans van Beuningen. The Rijksprentenkabinet of the Rijksmuseum Amsterdam has a collection of his drawings.

References

Further reading 
 Benno Tempel, Ronald de Leeuw: Het Romantiek Boek. Waanders Uitgevers, Zwolle, 2006. 
 Toni Wappenschmidt: "Marinen und Landschaften der holländischen Romantik". In: Die Weltkunst, Vol.62, 1992

External links 

 Brief biography @ Het Schildersgeslacht Koekkoek
 Brief biography @ the Leslie Smith website
 More works by Koekkoek @ ArtNet

1815 births
1882 deaths
19th-century Dutch painters
Dutch landscape painters
Dutch male painters
Dutch marine artists
People from Middelburg, Zeeland
19th-century Dutch male artists